Nikolay Pavlov (born 12 November 1987, in Plovdiv) is a Bulgarian footballer who plays as a midfielder and forward.

Career
Born in Plovdiv, Pavlov started his career with local side Spartak Plovdiv. Because of his good displays he caught eye of Lokomotiv Sofia scouts and signed for the club in June 2007 for fee of 50 000 € together with Ivaylo Dimitrov and Rumen Tinkov.

After a match in UEFA Cup qualification against Borac Cacak on August 14, 2008, Pavlov was tested positive for testosterone. Although he was substitute who did not play in that match, he was suspended from all official football competitions for a period of two years by UEFA.

In June 2011, it was officially announced that Pavlov had signed a contract with Lyubimetz 2007. He spent successful one and a half years at the club, playing a total of 36 games in the second division, scoring 20 goals. Pavlov finished the 2011–12 season as the league's top goal scorer with 13 goals.

On 5 January 2013, Pavlov joined Botev Plovdiv on a three-year contract.

References

External links
Player Profile at Soccerway

1987 births
Living people
Bulgarian footballers
First Professional Football League (Bulgaria) players
FC Spartak Plovdiv players
FC Lokomotiv 1929 Sofia players
Botev Plovdiv players
FC Lyubimets players
PFC Chernomorets Burgas players
FC Maritsa Plovdiv players
Doping cases in association football
Bulgarian sportspeople in doping cases
Association football midfielders